The Hubbard House (also known as San Sui) is a historic house in Crescent City, Florida, United States. It is located at 600 North Park Street.

Description and history 
On August 14, 1973, it was added to the National Register of Historic Places.

References

External links

 Putnam County listings at National Register of Historic Places
 Putnam County listings at Florida's Office of Cultural and Historical Programs

Gallery

Houses on the National Register of Historic Places in Florida
National Register of Historic Places in Putnam County, Florida
Shingle Style houses
Shingle Style architecture in Florida
Vernacular architecture in Florida
Houses in Putnam County, Florida
1877 establishments in Florida
Houses completed in 1877